Aribash (Äribaş) is a rural locality (a village) in Kudashevsky Selsoviet, Tatyshlinsky District, Bashkortostan, Russia. The population was 552 as of 2010. There are 9 streets.

Geography 
Aribash is located 8 km southwest of Verkhniye Tatyshly (the district's administrative centre) by road. Aribashevo is the nearest rural locality.

References 

Rural localities in Tatyshlinsky District